Eddie Washington (June 8, 1953 – June 4, 2010) was a Democratic member of the Illinois House of Representatives, representing the 60th District from 2003 until 2010.

In 1998, Washington was elected a trustee for the North Shore Sanitary District. Washington defeated Jerry L. Johnson, a past Mayor of North Chicago, and Jay Ukena in the 2002 Democratic primary for the nomination for the Illinois House in the 60th district. He was elected to the Illinois House of Representatives in 2002 general election. The 60th district, at the time, included all or parts of Waukegan and North Chicago.

He was the sergeant at arms for the Illinois Legislative Black Caucus. Washington died on June 4, 2010, after suffering a heart attack. His appointed successor, Rita Mayfield, took office on July 6, 2010.

References

External links
Official Website
Illinois General Assembly - Representative Eddie Washington (D) 60th District official IL House website
Bills Committees
Project Vote Smart - Representative Eddie Washington (IL) profile
Follow the Money - Eddie Washington
2006 2004 2002 campaign contributions
Illinois House Democrats - Eddie Washington profile

1953 births
2010 deaths
African-American state legislators in Illinois
Democratic Party members of the Illinois House of Representatives
21st-century American politicians
21st-century African-American politicians
20th-century African-American people